Meadow Run is a  long 4th order tributary to the Youghiogheny River in Fayette County, Pennsylvania.

Variant names
According to the Geographic Names Information System, it has also been known historically as:
Great Meadow Run

Course
Meadow Run rises about 1 mile northeast of Washington Springs, Pennsylvania, and then flows southeast and northeast to join the Youghiogheny River at Ohiopyle.

Watershed
Meadow Run drains  of area, receives about 50.7 in/year of precipitation, has a wetness index of 376.51, and is about 82% forested.

See also
List of rivers of Pennsylvania

References

Tributaries of the Youghiogheny River
Rivers of Pennsylvania
Rivers of Fayette County, Pennsylvania